Chanaq (also Romanized as Chanāq; also known as Ḩānākh) is a village in Abish Ahmad Rural District, Abish Ahmad District, Kaleybar County, East Azerbaijan Province, Iran. At the 2006 census, its population was 108, in 22 families.

References 

Populated places in Kaleybar County